Rudy Clay may refer to:
Rahman Ali (born 1945), boxer, brother of Muhammad Ali, born with the name Rudolph Valentino Clay
Rudy Clay (politician) (1935–2013), mayor of Gary, Indiana, USA